Goran Gocić (born May 6, 1962) is a Serbian freelance journalist,<ref name="latimes1">(13 August 2007). Finding roots in a reel Balkan village, Los Angeles Times" ("Goran Gocic a Serbian film critic who has written a biography of Kusturica ...")</ref> editor, author and filmmaker, whose work has been published or broadcast by many media organizations worldwide. Gocic is the winner of the NIN Prize, a prestigious Serbian literary award for 2014.

Books
 Pornocratia: A Cultural History of Sex in the Media (2008/2009), a monograph on the ascent of pornography in the West, is his largest project so far.
 Želimir Žilnik: Above the Red Dust (2003) (chapter)
 Notes from the Underground: The Cinema of Emir Kusturica (2001/2006)  
 Degraded Capability: Media and the Kosovo Crisis (2000) (chapter) 
 Andy Warhol and Strategies of Pop (1997)
 Tai (2013)
 Last Stop Britain (2017)
 A Man From Negligence (2021)

Education
Gocić graduated from the Faculty of Philology in Belgrade in 1991 with a degree in English language and literature. He received an M.A. in Media and Communications from the London School of Economics in 1999.

Cinematography
Gocić worked as an undercover reporter (in style of Gunter Walraff’s Ganz Unten) in the documentary Bloody Foreigners (2001) for the UK Channel 4 series Dispatches. He has become a champion of the DV revolution. 

He runs Force Majeure, the production company for feature documentaries Balkan Diaries: Bulgaria, on Orthodox priests facing transitional turmoil and Today a Visa, Tomorrow the World'' on Serbian troubles with visas.

References

Living people
Serbian journalists
1962 births
Writers from Užice
Serbian film directors
Serbian novelists